Drunk Baby Project, released on October 1, 2002, is the second album by the comedian Bruce McCulloch. It has 14 tracks of McCulloch's unique comedic music.

Track listing
"Drunk Baby Project" (Brian Connelly, Bruce McCulloch) – 3:09
"Bob Seger" (Connelly, McCulloch, Craig Northey) – 2:58
"Caller Go Ahead" (McCulloch) – 0:54
"Cheer for the Team" (Connelly, McCulloch, Northey) – 2:28
"For the Ladies" (Connelly, McCulloch, Northey) – 3:10
"The Bible" (Connelly, McCulloch) – 1:04
"Sucra Poppa" (Connelly, McCulloch, Tracy Ryan) – 2:45
"Clinique Ladies" (Connelly, McCulloch) – 4:27
"Flying Dream" (Connelly, McCulloch) – 2:15
"Warehouse Prayer" (Connelly, McCulloch, Northey) – 2:32
"Hangover Chronicles" (Connelly, McCulloch, Northey) – 3:29
"Never Trust" (Connelly, McCulloch) – 2:40
"One Good Cup" (McCulloch) – 1:36
"Lil' Gay Waiter" (Connelly, McCulloch, Northey) – 3:49
"Aliens" (McCulloch) – 2:38

Personnel
Bruce McCulloch – vocals
Brian Connelly – guitar
Craig Northey – guitar
Tracy Ryan – additional vocals

References

External links
"Drunk Baby Project" Title track of Drunk Baby Project

2002 albums
Bruce McCulloch albums
2000s comedy albums